Ahmet Canbaz (born 27 April 1998) is a Turkish professional footballer who plays as a midfielder for Turkish club BB Erzurumspor.

Career
In December 2018, Canbaz's contract with Eintracht Braunschweig was terminated. A few days later, he joined Werder Bremen II.

Honours
Trabzonspor
Turkish Cup: 2019–20

References

External links

1998 births
Living people
German people of Turkish descent
Turkish footballers
German footballers
Footballers from Hanover
Turkey youth international footballers
Association football midfielders
2. Bundesliga players
3. Liga players
Regionalliga players
Süper Lig players
Eintracht Braunschweig II players
Eintracht Braunschweig players
SV Werder Bremen II players
Trabzonspor footballers
Ümraniyespor footballers
Büyükşehir Belediye Erzurumspor footballers